Dorte Christensen is a Danish former cricketer. She played eleven Women's One Day International matches for Denmark women's national cricket team between 1995 and 1999.

References

External links
 

Year of birth missing (living people)
Living people
Danish women cricketers
Denmark women One Day International cricketers
Place of birth missing (living people)